David Anthony Kirby (born 1945) is a  British academic working in the area of business administration and entrepreneurship.  He is currently Vice President (Research, Enterprise and Community Service) in the British University in Egypt, where he has been employed since 2007, initially as Founding Dean and Vodafone Chair of Business Administration.  Prior to that appointment he was a professor of entrepreneurship at the University of Surrey in Guildford, UK, having  held the UK's first chair in Entrepreneurship at the University of Durham in 1989.  He is a pioneer of entrepreneurship  education in the UK and in 2006 was awarded the Queen's Award for Enterprise Promotion.

He has been a vice president and director of The International Council for Small Business and a director of the UK Institute for Small Business and Entrepreneurship, in addition to being  a visiting professor at the Henley Management College (University of Reading) and the University of Loughborough, and an adjunct professor at the University of South Australia and  the University of Tehran.  He holds Fellowships of The Royal Society of Arts, the Institute of Business Consultants and the Higher Education Academy.  His publications, which number some 150 journal articles and 18 books and research monographs, include the text Entrepreneurship  (McGraw-Hill, 2003). His research currently focuses on entrepreneurial  education, entrepreneurial universities  and innovation and social enterprise in Egypt, and he is the research leader for the Egyptian Global Entrepreneurship Monitor project. Currently he edits the Emerald journal Education, Business and Society: contemporary Middle Eastern Issues.

References

External links
 David A. Kirby faculty profile, British University in Egypt

Queen's Award for Enterprise Promotion (2006)
British businesspeople
1942 births
Living people
Academics of the University of Surrey